Jeux Descartes was a French publisher of roleplaying games and board games. Their most popular lines included: Eurogames, a set of serious board games, previously published by Duccio Vitale's independent company; Blue Games, small card games for larger groups; and Games for Two.

Jeux Descartes was founded in 1977 and went out of business in 2005. Their assets are now owned by former rival Asmodée Éditions, and are sold under the Descartes Editeur imprint.

Products

Role-playing games
Malefices (1985-1994): An investigative horror roleplaying game set in Belle Époque France. 
L'Appel de Cthulhu (1984-2005): A French translation of the Second Edition Call of Cthulhu rules.

Boardgames

Card games

Wargames
Amirauté (1979): A set of tactical or strategic ship-level World War II naval warfare miniatures rules. The rules simulated ship-to-ship combat, torpedoes, naval bombardment, and naval aviation.    
Dune (1979): A wargame based on the Dune book series. Players play one of the factions: Bene Gesserit, Emperor Shaddam IV, Fremen, House Atreides, House Harkonnen or the Spacing Guild.
1870 (1978): A division-level wargame simulating the Franco-Prussian War.
Les Aigles: A set of Napoleonic Wars miniatures rules. The Boxed Set edition (1987) came with the wargame rule booklet and cardboard scenery pieces that could be assembled. The Rule Book edition (1990) was just the rules booklet by itself. The Supplement Number 1 (1990) came with army lists for Austria and Russia, 14 scenarios, and colored cardboard unit chits.  
Serenissima: An economy and warfare simulation set in an Italian seaport during the Renaissance.

External links 
 Jeux Descartes' official website
 

Board game publishing companies
Game manufacturers